Angel Emanuel Luna (Born in Buenos Aires, Argentina, January 30, 1989), current professional Argentine football player, who plays for Ituzaingó on loan from Villa San Carlos.

Career 

Luna excelled in the youth divisions of the Argentine Baby Futbol League and is discovered in 2003 by Nestor Ariel Valenzuela, former player on the Argentine Youth National Team. Luna was playing in the 9th Division at Villa Olimpica at Velez Sarsfield and won an award for Outstanding Forward in the AFA Parallel Tournament.

In 2004, Club Atletico San Lorenzo de Almagro officially signs Luna to the club where he played from 8th to 4th Division with the club's system and is once again considered one of the most outstanding players in Argentine youth football.  Luna won a youth national championship with San Lorenzo and was the top scorer in the 6th Division of the league. Luna was called up to debut with Reserve Team of the First Division where he scored a goal against Argentinos Juniors and was also called up to the U18 and U20 Pre-National Teams under the guidance of Hugo Tocalli. Luna was then signed as a professional player by Club Altetico River Plate where he continues to play in the Reserve Team.

Due to Luna's playing characteristics, he has been compared to Carlos Tevez and Sergio “Kun” Agüero and displays natural talent in an attacking midfield/forward role which Argentine football is known to produce. Luna also been compared to Ezequiel Lavezzi due his physical characteristics and speed, whereby he was nicknamed “Pocho” after Lavezzi during his time at San Lorenzo but he is better known as “Bebu”.

Luna is a talented player and has excellent control with both his left and right feet. He has scored as many goals with his left foot as with his right foot, which is his dominant profile. His main characteristic as an attacking midfielder is his skill and power, and due to his exceptional sense of the game, how to play and how to help his teammates play he is often the strategist of his team and scorer.  As an attacking midfielder, he is strong, fast, and strong defensively when marking the opposition.

His personality on the field often shows as he imposes his playing style with strength, courage, and temperament especially in decisive games such as finales and derbies or in situations where the team must come back from being down in the score.

He started at River Plate in their 4th Division and the club quickly signed him up as a professional for three seasons in order to begin playing in their Reserve Team under the guidance of Ernesto “Carucha” Corti and under the coaching staff headed by Leonardo Astrada and Hernan Diaz.

At the start of 2011, Luna was working his way to an opportunity to play in First Division and was on loan to San Martin de Tucuman in the Argentine Second Division (Nacional B). Luna played very well and was highlighted in the local media, however, the club had only one position available and the club decided to bring in an attacking midfielder with experience in First Division. San Martin is still considering signing up Luna when the transfer window in Argentina opens up or Luna will continue at River Plate and consider his chances now that River Plate has been relegated to Second Division.

Youth National Team

Pre-National Team U18 
Hugo Tocalli puts together a Pre-National Team in 2006 as the base for the U20 National Team to qualify to the World Cup in Egypt. Tocalli used this team as the start of his Excellence Youth Development Program for national teams.

Pre-National Team U20 
In September 2007, Luna qualifies as player in 5th Division and is called up to the Program for the U20 National Team. Unfortunately, Hugo Tocalli resigns that same year and Luna opportunities must now be focused on the U23 National team or the Men's National Team.

Player statistics

Games Played 
21 games in Reserve Teams of First Division

Goals
1 Goal with Reserve Team of Club Atletico San Lorenzo de Almagro against Argentinos Juniors (Debut with Reserve Team)

6 Goals with Reserve Team of Club Atletico River Plate: against San Lorenzo, Lanus, Godoy Cruz, Argentinos Juniors and Huracan

References

External links 
 Futbolmanagers.
 Nota en Diario Popular.
 Nota en Diario Popular.
 Ángel Luna, un proyecto a seguir (Sitio oficial de River Plate).
 

Argentine footballers
Argentine expatriate footballers
Living people
1989 births
Association football forwards
Flandria footballers
Sud América players
Villa Dálmine footballers
C.A. Cerro players
Liverpool F.C. (Montevideo) players
Club Atlético Villa San Carlos footballers
UAI Urquiza players
Club Atlético Ituzaingó players
Primera Nacional players
Primera B Metropolitana players
Uruguayan Primera División players
Argentine expatriate sportspeople in Uruguay
Expatriate footballers in Uruguay
Footballers from Buenos Aires